Bad Grund (Harz) is a town in the district of Göttingen, in Lower Saxony, Germany. It is situated in the western Harz, approx. 7 km west of Clausthal-Zellerfeld, and 10 km north of Osterode am Harz.

Bad Grund is also the name of the former Samtgemeinde ("collective municipality") Bad Grund, of which Bad Grund formed part. It was disbanded in March 2013 and replaced by the Einheitsgemeinde Bad Grund.

Points of interest
 Historic Market Place
 St. Antony's Church was built in 1540. The church is surrounded by half-timbered houses dating from the 17th, 18th and 19th centuries
 WeltWald Harz
 Hübichenstein
 Hilfe Gottes Mine
 Iberger Tropfsteinhöhle

References

Towns in the Harz
Spa towns in Germany